An executor is someone who carries something out, such as the administration of an estate.

"Executor" may also refer to:
 Executor (software), for running 68k Macintosh applications on IBM-compatible PCs
 Executor (Star Wars), a fictional starship in the Star Wars universe
 Executor (rocket engine) a liquid fuel rocket engine

See also
 Executer, a Brazilian thrash metal band
 Executioner (disambiguation)